C. Eugene Stephens (December 20, 1889 – June 25, 1970) was an American politician. He served as the State Treasurer of Missouri from 1925 to 1929.

References

1889 births
1970 deaths
State treasurers of Missouri
Missouri Republicans
20th-century American politicians